The discography of South Korean singer-songwriter, musical actor Yang Yo-seob consists of one studio album, two extended plays and six singles.

Studio albums

Extended plays

Singles

As lead artist

Collaborations

As featured artist

Soundtrack appearances

Other charted songs

Music Videos

References 

Discographies of South Korean artists
Highlight (band)